Emersonella is a genus of hymenopteran insects of the family Eulophidae. Several species are known to be phoretic parasitoids of female tortoise beetles, laying their eggs in the eggs of the beetle host.

References

External links

Key to Nearctic eulophid genera
Universal Chalcidoidea Database

Eulophidae
Ralph Waldo Emerson
Taxa named by Alexandre Arsène Girault